The Cassidy station is located in Cassidy, British Columbia. The station was a flag stop on Via Rail's Dayliner which ended in 2011. The station is on the Southern Railway of Vancouver Island mainline.

The Cassidy railway station was established on March 31, 1924 being named after Thomas Cassidy, a local farmer who homesteaded in the area and delivered milk and supplies to the railway.

Footnotes

External links 
Via Rail Station Description

Via Rail stations in British Columbia
Railway stations in Canada opened in 1924
Disused railway stations in Canada